Wei Wei (sometimes subtitled "A Taste of Taiwan") is a Taiwanese restaurant in Portland, Oregon, United States. The restaurant operates in a strip mall in southeast Portland's Sellwood-Moreland neighborhood.

History

Wei Wei opened in 2015. In August 2018, the restaurant announced plans to close due to the owner's health. In October, Wei Wei confirmed plans to reopen under new ownership, whom Brooke Jackson-Glidden of Eater Portland described as a "longtime customer and friend" of the previous owner. The restaurant's interior and menu were generally unchanged.

See also

 List of Chinese restaurants

References

External links
 
 
 Wei Wei at TimeOut

2015 establishments in Oregon
Chinese restaurants in Portland, Oregon
Restaurants established in 2015
Sellwood-Moreland, Portland, Oregon
Taiwanese restaurants
Taiwanese-American culture